Tazehabad-e Taleqan (also Romanized as Tāzehābād-e Ţāleqān) is a village in Shiyan Rural District, in the Central District of Eslamabad-e Gharb County, Kermanshah Province, Iran. At the 2006 census, its population was 149, in 32 families.

References 

Populated places in Eslamabad-e Gharb County